The ATP Champions Tour is a men's tennis tour intended for former tennis professionals, who have since retired from mainstream professional tennis touring (The ATP).  The Tour brings together many of the greatest tennis players in history for nostalgic, competitive and entertaining tournaments in cities around the world.

For a player to be eligible for play on this tour, he must be in the year of his 35th birthday or have been retired from the ATP World Tour for two years or more. Each player must have been either a world No. 1, a Grand Slam finalist, or a singles player in a winning Davis Cup team. Each event can also invite two players of its choice to take wild cards.

The Tour usually consists of around 10 events around the world, with a year-ending "My World Champions Tennis" event held at the Royal Albert Hall in London. Events are typically played over four days with eight-man fields competing against each other in a round-robin format, ensuring that all players feature in at least three matches. The players are split into two groups of four. The top player from each group contests the final, while the two players who finish second in each group play off for third and fourth places respectively.

Matches are contested over the best of three sets, with the deciding set taking the form of a Champions tie-break. The Champions tie-break is an expanded version of the conventional professional tennis tie-break, whereby the winner is the first player to reach 10 points and lead by a margin of 2.

Rankings points on the Tour are distributed as follows: Winner: 400 / Runner-up: 300 / 3rd place: 200 / 4th place: 150 / No. 5-6: 80 / No. 7-8: 60 points.

Notable participants, in past and present, are: John McEnroe, Björn Borg, Mats Wilander, Henri Leconte, Pete Sampras, Mansour Bahrami, Stefan Edberg, Boris Becker, Jim Courier, Thomas Muster, Marcelo Ríos, Goran Ivanišević, Yevgeny Kafelnikov, Patrick Rafter, Ivan Lendl, Carlos Moyá, Jimmy Connors, Tim Henman and Andy Roddick.

Participants

The following is a list of past participants on the ATP Champions Tour

  Mansour Bahrami
  Jeremy Bates
  Boris Becker
  James Blake
  Björn Borg
  Sergi Bruguera
  Omar Camporese
  Pat Cash
  Michael Chang
  José Luis Clerc
  Jimmy Connors
  Albert Costa
  Jim Courier
  Marcos Daniel
  Stefan Edberg
  Younes El Aynaoui
  Thomas Enqvist
  Wayne Ferreira
  Guy Forget
  Renzo Furlan
  Brad Gilbert
  Justin Gimelstob
  Andrés Gómez
  Fernando Gonzalez
  Magnus Gustafsson
  Paul Haarhuis
  Tim Henman
  Goran Ivanišević
  Anders Järryd
  Yevgeny Kafelnikov
  Petr Korda
  Richard Krajicek
  Aaron Krickstein
  Magnus Larsson
  Henri Leconte
  Ivan Lendl
  Todd Martin
  Xavier Malisse
  John McEnroe
  Fernando Meligeni
  Carlos Moyá
  Thomas Muster
  Yannick Noah
  Mikael Pernfors
  Mark Philippoussis
  Cédric Pioline
  Patrick Rafter
  Guillaume Raoux
  Marcelo Ríos
  Andy Roddick
  Greg Rusedski
  Marat Safin
  Pete Sampras
  Fabrice Santoro
  Flávio Saretta
  Carl-Uwe Steeb
  Michael Stich
  Guillermo Vilas
  Mats Wilander
  Mariano Zabaleta

Year-end number 1

Past finals

2000

2001

2002

2003

2004

2005

2006

2007

2008

 Only 4 participants

2009

2010

2011

2012

2013

2014

 Only 4 participants.

2015

2016

2017

2018

2019

2020

References

External links
Official website
Champions Tennis

Tennis tours and series
Men's tennis tournaments
Association of Tennis Professionals
Senior sports competitions
Masters tennis